Yaacov Bergman (born May 31, 1945) is an Israeli born conductor. He is currently the Musical Director and Conductor of the Walla Walla Symphony, the Portland Chamber Orchestra, Artistic Director and Conductor of the Siletz Bay Music Festival in Lincoln City, Oregon and previously the Musical Director of the Colorado Springs Symphony, the New York Heritage Chamber Orchestra, and the 92nd St. Y Symphonic Workshop Orchestra in New York City. Yaacov Bergman is married to pianist and pedagogue Joan Behrens-Bergman.

Early years
Yaacov Bergman's early musical training began with violin and vocal studies, but he soon expressed an avid interest in composing and conducting. After graduation from the Jerusalem Academy of Music and Dance with majors in conducting and composition, he completed post-graduate studies at the Mannes College of Music in New York as a student of Richard Westenburg. He pursued further conducting studies under the guidance of Charles Bruck, a disciple of Pierre Monteux, as well as private study under Leonard Bernstein. In 1998 he was the recipient of an Honorary Doctorate from Colorado Technical University.

International Tours

His success in July 1996 in Japan as conductor of the Osaka Opera Company's premiere performance of Verdi's opera Macbeth led to subsequent engagements which included La Traviata in Osaka and Kobe. Bergman guest conducted with the Osaka Symphonica, a concert tour with the Israel Chamber Orchestra and he recently served as principal guest conductor of the "North Atlantic Music Festival" in Denmark. Maestro Bergman conducted a series of successful symphonic concerts in Cairo, Egypt in 1995 and 1996 as the first Israeli conductor to appear in an Arab republic. Bergman was engaged in a series of performances of La Boheme in the Philippines, and performances of Don Giovanni, Carmen, Tosca, and La Traviata for the Cultural Center of the Philippines in Manila, where he has also conducted numerous symphonic concerts as principal guest conductor of the Philippine Philharmonic Orchestra.

North America Visits
Yaacov Bergman has guest conducted with the Buffalo Philharmonic, the San Diego Symphony, the Edmonton Symphony in Canada, the West Virginia Symphony, the Redlands Symphony, a debut performance with the Vienna Radio Symphony Orchestra and a third appearance with the Brooklyn Philharmonic in New York.

World Premieres
Bergman's interest in new music and multi-media concepts is reflected in his programming of many new works. He has presented premieres of pieces by noted American composers Robert Starer, William Bolcom, John Verrall, Gwyneth Walker, John David Earnest, Tania Cronin, David Glenn, Tom Simon and Duncan Neilson, and composers from around the world including Arvo Pärt, Gorecki, Kancheli, Tzur, Tzvi Avni, Shariff and Ben-Amotz.

External links
 Walla Walla Symphony
 Portland Chamber Orchestra
 Siletz Bay Music Festival

References
 Schultz, D. (2006). "A Dream Fulfilled"
 Walla Walla Symphony Website

1945 births
Living people
Israeli conductors (music)
Place of birth missing (living people)
21st-century conductors (music)